The Wyoming House For Historic Women, also known as Wyoming Women's History House is a museum in downtown Laramie, Wyoming, United States, which celebrates the achievements of 13 women from the state of Wyoming. It was established by the Louisa Swain Foundation, which honors Louisa Swain,  the first woman in the United States to vote in a general election. She cast her ballot on September 6, 1870, in Laramie, Wyoming. The museum opened in 2012. The Wyoming State Historical Society says Swain was "the first woman in the world to cast a ballot under laws giving women and men equal voting rights".

The Johnson Lummis Hunkins Plaza is outside the Wyoming House for Historic Women. A statue of Louisa Swain in her honor was dedicated in the Johnson Lummis Hunkins Plaza in 2005. The statue is called "The Franchise", and was created by John D. Baker.

The women
The women who form the subject matter of the museum are:
Louisa Gardner Swain, first woman in the United States to vote in a general election, 1870
Eliza Stewart, first woman in America selected to serve on a jury, 1870
Martha Symons Boies Atkinson, first female bailiff in the United States, 1870
Lynne Cheney, wife of Vice President Dick Cheney
Barbara Cubin, first woman to represent Wyoming in Congress, starting in 1995
Verda James, first woman to serve a full term as the Speaker of the Wyoming House of Representatives
Marilyn S. Kite, first female Chief Justice on the Wyoming Supreme Court, chosen in 2010 
April Brimmer Kunz, first female President of the Wyoming Senate, starting in 2003 and ending in 2005
All Woman Council of Jackson, an all-woman city government (including town council and mayor, who in turn appointed women to town marshal, town clerk and treasurer), elected in 1920
Anna Edith Miller, first woman licensed as a nurse in Wyoming, licensed in 1909
Esther Hobart Morris, first female justice of the peace in the United States, 1870 
Estelle Reel, first woman elected to Wyoming public office, as the State Superintendent of Public Instruction, elected in 1895
Nellie Tayloe Ross, Governor and first female Director of the U.S. Mint

References

External links

Museums in Albany County, Wyoming
2012 establishments in Wyoming
Buildings and structures in Laramie, Wyoming
Tourist attractions in Laramie, Wyoming
Museums established in 2012
Women's museums in the United States
Buildings and structures completed in 2012
Women in Wyoming
History museums in Wyoming
History of women in Wyoming